Ralph William Grey (1819, Earsdon, Northumberland – 1 October 1869, Kingston upon Thames, Surrey) was a British Whig politician.

He was the son of Ralph William Grey (died 1822) of Backworth House, Northumberland, and his wife Ann, daughter of Rev. Sir Samuel Jervoise, 1st Baronet, and was educated at Eton College. He matriculated at Trinity College, Cambridge in 1836, graduating B.A. in 1840. In 1839 he became private secretary to Charles Poulett Thomson, shortly to become Baron Sydenham and the first Governor General of Canada.

At the  1847 general election he was elected unopposed as the Member of Parliament (MP) for Tynemouth and North Shields, but in 1852 he narrowly lost the seat to his Conservative opponent, (by 340 votes to 328). He returned to Parliament two years later when he was elected for Liskeard at a by-election in March 1854, and was re-elected at the general elections in 1857  and 1859. He resigned from the House of Commons on 6 August 1859 by becoming Steward of the Manor of Northstead.

See also

Politics of the United Kingdom

References

External links 
 

Members of the Parliament of the United Kingdom for English constituencies
1819 births
1869 deaths
UK MPs 1847–1852
UK MPs 1852–1857
UK MPs 1857–1859
Whig (British political party) MPs for English constituencies
Members of the Parliament of the United Kingdom for Liskeard